Tri Kusharjanto (born 18 January 1974) is a badminton player from Indonesia. His name also appears variously as Tri Kusharyanto, Trikus Harjanto, Trikus Heryanto, and Trikus Haryanto.

Personal life 
He married fellow former Asian Champions Sri Untari and together has a son named Rehan Naufal Kusharjanto who is also a badminton player and a winner of 2017 Asian Junior Championships.

Career 
Kusharjanto is a doubles specialist who achieved his greatest success in mixed doubles. Between 1994 and 2002 he won numerous international mixed doubles titles, the majority of them with Minarti Timur. These included the Thailand (1994, 1996), Indonesia (1995, 1996, 1997, 1998, 1999, 2001), Singapore (1995, 1998), Malaysia (1996, 1998, 2000), and Chinese Taipei (2002) Opens; the Badminton World Cup (1995), the World Badminton Grand Prix (1995), the Southeast Asian Games (1995), and the Badminton Asia Championships (1996). Though victories in badminton's three most prestigious events for individual players, the Olympics, the All England Championships, and the World Championships, eluded Kusharjanto, he and Timur came close in all three with a runner-up finish at the 1997 All Englands, a bronze medal at the 1997 World Championships in Glasgow, and a silver medal at the 2000 Olympics in Sydney. Though only occasionally chosen by the Indonesian Badminton Association to play international events in men's doubles, Kusharjanto has won some, most notably the Badminton Asia Championships with Bambang Suprianto in 2001 and with Sigit Budiarto in 2004. As a member of Indonesia's 2002 Thomas Cup team he helped his country to capture its thirteenth world team title by winning his championship round doubles match with Halim Haryanto.

Olympic record

1996 Summer Olympics 
He competed in badminton at the 1996 Summer Olympics in mixed doubles with partner Minarti Timur. They were defeated in the quarter final by the eventual gold medalist, Kim Dong-moon and Gil Young-ah of South Korea.

2000 Summer Olympics 
He competed in badminton at the 2000 Summer Olympics in mixed doubles with partner Minarti Timur. They won the silver medal after being defeated by the Chinese pair Zhang Jun and Gao Ling in the final.

2004 Summer Olympics 
He competed in badminton at the 2004 Summer Olympics in men's doubles with partner Sigit Budiarto. They were defeated in the round of 32 by Robert Mateusiak and Michał Łogosz of Poland.

Achievements

Olympic Games 
Mixed doubles

World Championships 
Mixed doubles

World Cup 
Mixed doubles

World Masters Games 

Men's doubles

World Senior Championships 
Men's doubles

Asian Games 
Men's doubles

Mixed doubles

Asian Championships 
Men's doubles

Mixed doubles

Asian Cup 
Mixed doubles

Southeast Asian Games 
Mixed doubles

IBF World Grand Prix 
The World Badminton Grand Prix has been sanctioned by the International Badminton Federation from 1983 to 2006.

Mixed doubles

 IBF Grand Prix tournament
 IBF Grand Prix Finals tournament

BWF International Challenge/Series 
Men's doubles

Mixed doubles

  BWF International Challenge tournament
  BWF/IBF International Series tournament

References

External links 
 
 
 
 

1974 births
Living people
Sportspeople from Special Region of Yogyakarta
Indonesian male badminton players
Badminton players at the 1996 Summer Olympics
Badminton players at the 2000 Summer Olympics
Badminton players at the 2004 Summer Olympics
Olympic badminton players of Indonesia
Olympic silver medalists for Indonesia
Olympic medalists in badminton
Medalists at the 2000 Summer Olympics
Badminton players at the 1998 Asian Games
Badminton players at the 2002 Asian Games
Asian Games gold medalists for Indonesia
Asian Games silver medalists for Indonesia
Asian Games bronze medalists for Indonesia
Asian Games medalists in badminton
Medalists at the 1998 Asian Games
Medalists at the 2002 Asian Games
Competitors at the 1995 Southeast Asian Games
Competitors at the 1997 Southeast Asian Games
Southeast Asian Games gold medalists for Indonesia
Southeast Asian Games silver medalists for Indonesia
Southeast Asian Games medalists in badminton
World No. 1 badminton players